is a museum in Tokyo, Japan. It is part of The University of Tokyo. UMUT was established in 1966 to mainly preserve the collection of the university. Today UMUT works with preservation, research, and exhibitions for the general public.

History
The University Museum was established on April 1, 1966 under the name .  In 1984 an extension of the main museum was built to house a dedicated exhibition space. On May 11, 1996 the museum was reorganized and got its current name. While the name in English remained the same, the new Japanese name reflected the ambition to work more on showing the collection to the public. The three last characters in both names could be translated as museum, but the old name is perhaps better translated as archive. In connection to the reorganization a new extension (2996 m2) to the main building was completed in 1995. In 2001 the old faculty of medicine building, which was relocated to Koishikawa Botanical Garden in 1969, was opened as a new exhibition space. In 2013 the exhibition space Intermediatheque (IMT) was opened in the old Central Post Office next to Tokyo Station. This larger space (~3000 m2) was established in part to show more of the museum collection. In 2014 an exhibition space called "Space Exploration, Education, and Discovery" (SEED) was opened at the TeNQ Space Museum, next to Tokyo Dome.

Mako Komuro, formerly Princess Mako of Akishino, the niece of Emperor Naruhito, worked as a researcher at the museum in 2016. Her father, Crown Prince Akishino, has also worked at the museum and is an honorary fellow.

Facilities 
The main building is situated in the south end of Hongō University campus and houses the main collection, as well as offices, research labs and a smaller exhibition space (~600 m2) — the Hall of Inspiration. The museum also has three satellite facilities with exhibitions. 
 Koishikawa Annex – The old faculty of medicine building which was relocated to Koishikawa Botanical Garden in 1969.
 Intermediatheque – exhibition space next to Tokyo Station with permanent and temporary exhibitions. Many old specimen cabinets are used for the displays. 
 SEED, TeNQ – exhibition next to Tokyo Dome focused on space exploration and the universe.

Collection 
UMUT has a main collection of 4 million items. It furthermore has several special collections. One such collection is the University Herbarium which holds over 1.7 million specimens. This herbarium has a large collection of specimens from the Himalayas and East Asia. The Index Herbariorum code assigned to this herbarium is TI, which is used when citing specimens. The museum collection originates from the time of the founding of the University of Tokyo in 1877 and some parts of the collection predate that as it comes from older institutions. Some of the mechanical displays now shown at Intermediatheque come e.g. from the Imperial College of Engineering which was incorporated into the new University of Tokyo. In the photography album of The University of Tokyo published in 1900 by Ogawa Kazumasa several images depict the collections and exhibitions of the university faculties.

Publications 
UMUT has two main publication series, the Research Bulletin and the Material Reports. UMUT has also published a newsletter since 1996, Ouroboros (ISSN 1342-3614), with 3 issues per year. Between 1984 and 1995 another series of newsletters was published.

Directors 
The directorship is held by one of the professors at UMUT.

1966-1996 

 1966–1968: Takeo Watanabe
 1968–1971: Hiroshi Hara
 1971–1973: Hirotarō Ōta
 1973–1976: Takeshi Sekino
 1975–1977: Nobuo Egami
 1978–1980: Naosuke Watanabe
 1980–1984: Eizo Inagaki
 1984–1985: Kazurō Haniwara
 1985–1987: Yukio Nose
 1987–1989: Toshihisa Takeuchi
 1989–1993: Takeshi Yōrō
 1993–1996: Masanori Aoyagi
 1996–1996: Yoshihiro Hayashi

1996- 

 1996–1999: Yoshihiro Hayashi
 1999–2001: Akihiko Kawaguchi
 2001–2006: Susumu Takahashi
 2006–2010: Yoshihiro Hayashi
 2010–2017: Yoshiaki Nishino
 2017–2020: Gen Suwa
 2020–: Yoshihiro Nishiaki

See also
 The University of Tokyo
 Koishikawa Annex
 Campus of the University of Tokyo

References

External links
 University Museum Official Website
 Intermediatheque
 Herbarium of The University Museum

Museums in Tokyo
Museums established in 1966
1966 establishments in Japan
University museums in Japan